Giammarco Frezza (born 12 September 1975) is a former Italian footballer.

Biography
Although he never played for Internazionale, Frezza was called up to take the squad photo with Nerazzurri in August 1996. He was loaned to various clubs before being transferred to A.S. Roma in exchange for Alessandro Frau in July 2001. Which sent him to sister club Palermo which also owned by Franco Sensi. In summer 2002, he was exchanged with Luigi Panarelli of Torino.

He made his Serie A debut on 29 September 2002 against Modena F.C.

In June 2009 he was signed by Potenza.
In September 2009. he left for Barletta as a free agent.

References

External links

aic.football.it

Italian footballers
Italy under-21 international footballers
U.S. Salernitana 1919 players
S.S. Fidelis Andria 1928 players
A.C. ChievoVerona players
Treviso F.B.C. 1993 players
Palermo F.C. players
Torino F.C. players
Delfino Pescara 1936 players
Calcio Foggia 1920 players
Potenza S.C. players
A.S.D. Barletta 1922 players
Serie A players
Serie B players
Association football midfielders
Footballers from Rome
1975 births
Living people